She Wants Revenge is the debut studio album by American rock band She Wants Revenge. Mixed by Michael Patterson, it was released on January 31, 2006 by Perfect Kiss, a subsidiary of Geffen Records.

The album cover shows a female model wearing white underwear, while the back cover reveals that she's holding a very large knife behind her back (i.e. "she wants revenge").

Critical reception

Barry Walters, writing for Rolling Stone, noted how the duo's musicianship sounded similar to other new wave bands like Joy Division and The Cure, concluding that "She Wants Revenge steal from the best, and steal well." James Christopher Monger of AllMusic was mixed on Warfield and Bravin's post-punk homage to their new wave inspirations, saying that, "[T]here's nothing wrong with honoring your influences by copping a few moves and singing in a fake British accent like Green Day with the intentions of updating a genre that many potential listeners are too young to have experienced first-hand, but it's another thing to do it without even the slightest deviation." Adam Moerder from Pitchfork was critical of the album, describing the song titles as "lazy permutations of post-punk poetry," found the melodies on the rock tracks too repetitive, and saw the highlights as being "eerily predictable." He concluded by calling the record, "Too ugly and inaccessible to suggest some sort of post-punk cash-out, they stick out in a batch of songs too bent on edifying studio wizardry over musicianship." Dave Gurney of Tiny Mix Tapes heavily panned the album's overall sound for lacking the energy their '80s influences had and the duo's lyricism feeling like high school poetry, saying that "these guys sound like an incredibly desperate attempt to cash in on the neo-post-punk bandwagon."

Commercial performance
As of September 2007, She Wants Revenge has sold 294,000 copies in the United States, according to Nielsen SoundScan.

Track listing
"Red Flags and Long Nights" – 5:10
"These Things" – 5:14
"I Don't Wanna Fall in Love" – 3:39
"Out of Control" – 3:39
"Monologue" – 4:56
"Broken Promises for Broken Hearts" – 3:19
"Sister" – 5:18
"Disconnect" – 2:29
"Us" – 4:23
"Someone Must Get Hurt" – 4:48
"Tear You Apart" – 4:46
"She Loves Me, She Loves Me Not" – 5:21
"Spend the Night" (UK bonus track) – 4:22
"Black Liner Run" (UK bonus track) – 4:52
"Tear You Apart (Chris Holmes Vs. Bystanders Remix)" (Japanese bonus track) – 6:40

The hidden track "Killing Time" is at track 66, after 53 blank tracks (51 on the UK CD), which are entitled "Wasted Air" – 0:04.

Charts

Weekly charts

Year-end charts

References

External links
 

2006 debut albums
Geffen Records albums
She Wants Revenge albums